Sâniob is a commune in Bihor County, Crișana, Romania. The village was named after Stephen I of Hungary's Holy Dexter - his preserved right hand which was kept in an abbey here. The name was granted by Ladislaus I of Hungary in 1083. It was conquered by the Ottomans in 1661, becoming the seat of a sanjak in Varat Eyalet. Called  by the new authorities, it was captured by the Habsburg monarchy in 1691.

It is composed of four villages:

 Cenaloș, to the southeast of Sâniob
 Ciuhoi, to the south of Sâniob
 Sâniob
 Sfârnaș, to the southwest of Sâniob

At the 2011 census, 56.7% of inhabitants were Hungarians, 37.3% Romanians and 5.6% Roma. 46.1% were Roman Catholic, 29% Romanian Orthodox, 16.4% Reformed, 5.9% Pentecostal and 0.9% Greek-Catholic.

Known as Sâniob prior to 1968, the commune's name was changed to Ciuhoi that year and its seat moved to the latter village. In 2012, the commune's previous name was revived and the seat moved back to Sâniob village.

References

Communes in Bihor County
Localities in Crișana